The 1995–96 Belgian Hockey League season was the 76th season of the Belgian Hockey League, the top level of ice hockey in Belgium. Eight teams participated in the league, and Griffoens Geel won the championship.

Regular season

Group A

Group B

Playoffs

Semifinals 
 IHC Leuven - HYC Herentals 5:11/2:13
 Griffoens Geel - Phantoms Deurne 5:6/3:1

3rd place 
 IHC Leuven - Phantoms Deurne 5:12/5:14

Final 
 HYC Herentals - Griffoens Geel 3:7/4:4

References
Season on hockeyarchives.info

Belgian Hockey League
Belgian Hockey League seasons
Bel